Tough Luv is the debut studio album by American hip hop duo Young Gunz. It was released on February 24, 2004 via Roc-A-Fella Records. Recording sessions took place at Sony Music Studios, Baseline Studios and Quad Recording in New York, and at The Studio and Homebase Studios in Philadelphia. Production was handled by Chad Hamilton, Just Blaze, Bink!, Boola, Darrell "Digga" Branch, Ez Elpee, Ruggedness and Scott Storch, with Jay-Z, Damon Dash and Kareem "Biggs" Burke serving as executive producers. It features guest appearances from Denim, Beanie Sigel, Cam'ron, Chingy, Freeway, Jay-Z, Juelz Santana, Omillio Sparks and Rell. 

The album peaked at number three on the Billboard 200 and topped the Top R&B/Hip-Hop Albums. By 2010, it sold 421,000 units in the US. Its lead single "No Better Love" peaked at number 36 on the Billboard Hot 100.

Track listing 

Sample credits
Track 1 contains elements of "(Do It, Do It) No One Does It Better" by The Spinners.
Track 3 contains a sample of "Better Love" by Luther Vandross.
Track 4 contains interpolations of "Peter Piper" by Run-DMC and "Flash to the Beat" by Grandmaster Flash and the Furious Five.
Track 5 contains a sample of "Rich Girl" by Hall & Oates.
Track 7 contains an interpolation of "I'd Rather Share You" written by D. Ervin.
Track 8 contains a sample of "Don't Stop Loving Me Now" by L.T.D.
Track 13 contains a sample of "I Need You" by The Temptations.
Track 14 contains a master sample use of the original recording of "All I Need Is Time" by First Choice.
Track 15 contains a sample of "(They Long to Be) Close to You" by Isaac Hayes.
Track 17 contains interpolations of "Gyrlz, They Love Me" by Heavy D and "Superrappin'" by Grandmaster Flash and the Furious Five.

Personnel

Christopher "Young Chris" Ries – vocals
Hanif "Neef Buck" Muhammad – vocals
Dwight "Beanie Sigel" Grant – vocals (track 2)
Gerrell "Rell" Gaddis – vocals (track 3)
LaRon "Juelz Santana" James – vocals (track 5)
Shawn "Jay-Z" Carter – vocals (track 6), executive producer
Denim – vocals (tracks: 7, 15)
Cameron "Cam'ron" Giles – vocals (track 10)
Kenneth "Omillio Sparks" Johnson – vocals (track 11)
Leslie "Freeway" Pridgen – vocals (track 13)
Howard "Chingy" Bailey – vocals (track 17)
Steve Tirpak – trumpet (track 1)
Emma Kummrow – violin (track 1)
Igor Szwec – violin (track 1)
Gloria Justen – violin (track 1)
Larry Gold – cello, additional strings and horns (track 1)
E-Bass – keyboards and guitars (tracks: 4, 7)
Matt McCarrin – additional keyboards (track 9)
J. I. of Team PB – additional vocals (track 10)
Cosmic Kev – additional scratches (track 13)
Roosevelt "Bink!" Harrell III – producer (track 1)
Spunk Digga – co-producer (track 1)
Shane "Bermuda" Woodley – recording (tracks: 1, 3-5, 7, 10, 12, 14)
Jeff Chestek – recording (track 1)
Dragan "Chach" Cacinovic – mixing (tracks: 1, 3, 5, 9, 10, 16, 17)
Chad Hamilton – producer & recording (tracks: 2, 3, 5, 8, 9, 11, 13-15)
Doug Wilson – mixing (tracks: 2, 8, 11, 13-15)
Ryan Presson – co-producer (tracks: 3, 13-15)
Justin "Just Blaze" Smith – producer (tracks: 4, 7)
Ken Lewis – mixing (tracks: 4, 7)
Scott Storch – producer (track 6)
Gimel "Young Guru" Keaton – recording (track 6), mixing (track 12)
Kam Houff – mixing (track 6)
Melvin "Ruggedness" Carter – producer (track 10)
Alrad "Boola" Lewis – producer (track 12)
Caveman – recording (track 13)
Shane Boog – co-producer (track 15)
Lamont "Ez Elpee" Porter – producer (track 16)
The Thorobreads – additional producer(s) (track 16)
Carlisle Young – recording (tracks: 16, 17)
Darrell "Digga" Branch – producer (track 17)
Tony Dawsey – mastering
Damon "Dame" Dash – executive producer
Kareem "Biggs" Burke – executive producer
Andrew Huggins – recording administrator
Eric Weissman – sample clearance agent
Dawud West – art direction, design
Mark Mann – photography
Oluwaseye Olusa – additional photography
Patrick Reynolds – A&R administrator
Darcell Lawrence – A&R direction
Darrin Chandler – A&R direction
Ramses Francois – A&R coordinator
Travis Cummings – A&R coordinator
Gary "Big Face" Bien-Aime – A&R
Shalik Berry – A&R
Sherman Dudley – management
Jay Brown – management
Amber Noble – marketing
Girard Hunt – marketing
Shari Bryant – marketing
Jennifer Justice – legal

Charts

Weekly charts

Year-end charts

References

External links

2004 debut albums
Young Gunz albums
Def Jam Recordings albums
Roc-A-Fella Records albums
Albums produced by Just Blaze
Albums produced by Scott Storch
Albums produced by Bink (record producer)